The China Theatre Association is a subordinate of the China Federation of Literary and Art Circles (CFLAC). Founded on July 24, 1949, the organisation was initially named the China National Theatre Workers Association. In 1953, it was renamed the China Theatre Association. So far it has more than 11,000 registered members, with branch associations across the nation.

History
China Theatre Association was founded in July 1949 with the name of China National Theatre Workers Association.

In 1953 China National Theatre Workers Association changed its name to China Theatre Association.

In 1981, it joined the International Association of Artists and founded the Chinese Center.

At the end of 1987, it had more than 7,000 registered members.

In late 2008, it had more than 10,364 registered members.

On 30 June 2005, Plum blossom Award Art Troupe was set up.

On 16 July 2015, Pu Cunxin was chosen as its Chair in the Eighth National Congress of China Theatre Association.

Major officials
 Pu Cunxin (Chairman)
 Shang Changrong (Honorary chairman)
 Yu Kuizhi, Wang Xiaoying, Feng Yuping, Li Shujian, Yang Fengyi, Shen Tiemei, Mao Weitao, Luo Huaizhen, Meng Bing, Meng Guanglu, Liu Ping, and Han Sheng (Vice-Chairman)
 Zhou Guang, Cui Wei, and Zhu Zhengming (Deputy Secretary-General)
 Liu Housheng, former vice chairman

List of chairmen

Awards
China Theater Awards were established in 2005, it comprises Plum Blossom Prize for stage performance (founded in 1983) and the Cao Yu Theater Award for writing (founded in 1981).

Academic journal
China Theatre (founded in 1954) was its official journal.

References

External links
 

1949 establishments in China
Arts organizations based in China
Arts organizations established in 1949
Theatre in China